Helenodes  murmurata is a species of moth in the family Plutellidae.

This species is known from Assam, India, and has a wingspan of 13–16 mm.

References

Plutellidae
Moths of Asia
Moths described in 1913
Taxa named by Edward Meyrick